Zabr (also known as Zevr) is a village in Gabrik Rural District, in the Central District of Jask County, Hormozgan Province, Iran. At the 2006 census, its population was 79, in 17 families.

References 

Populated places in Jask County